KESM-FM (105.5 FM, Home of the Big Ape) is a radio station broadcasting a country music format. Licensed to El Dorado Springs, Missouri, United States, the station is owned by Wildwood Communications and features programming from Westwood One.

Wildwood previously held a sister station operating as KESM on 1580 kHz. KESM's license was surrendered to the Federal Communications Commission on August 31, 2015, and cancelled on September 1, 2015.

References

External links
 
 

Country radio stations in the United States
ESM-FM